"Heart of Mine" is a 2000 song written and sung by composer-lyricist Peter Salett. Its album was sent to Edward Norton in 2000 when he was making his directorial debut in Keeping the Faith, and the title song ended up being used as the theme for the film.

References

2000 songs
Songs written for films